Joseph West (1910–1965) was an English footballer who played as a forward in the Football League for Cardiff City and Darlington.

Life and career
West was born in 1910 in Walker, Northumberland, the sixth child of Joseph West, a colliery deputy, and his wife Alice.

He played football as a centre forward for Walker Park, from where he signed for Newcastle United in May 1932 after scoring all five Newcastle goals in a trial appearance in a friendly match. He spent 18 months with the club, never appeared for the first team, and, described as a speedy inside forward, moved on to Cardiff City in November 1933. He made six appearances in the Third Division South and scored twice, in a 3–1 defeat to Luton Town in December and a 4–2 victory over Bournemouth in January 1934, and was released on a free transfer at the end of the season.

West joined North Eastern League club Walker Celtic, scored four goals against North Shields on his debut, and two days later moved back into the Football League with Darlington. In January 1935, he scored 10 goals for Darlington Reserves as they beat West Stanley 12–2 in the North Eastern League, and was the top scorer for the reserve side, but could not dislodge the prolific Jerry Best from the first team. He played only twice in the Third Division North, when Best was unavailable, and scored once: Darlington's fourth goal in a 4–1 defeat of Lincoln City in March. By November, he was back with Walker Celtic.

West died in Newcastle upon Tyne in 1965 at the age of 55.

Notes

References

1910 births
1965 deaths
Footballers from Newcastle upon Tyne
English footballers
Association football forwards
Newcastle United F.C. players
Cardiff City F.C. players
Walker Celtic F.C. players
Darlington F.C. players
English Football League players
Date of death missing